Vexillum goubini is a species of small sea snail, marine gastropod mollusk in the family Costellariidae, the ribbed miters.

The subspecies Vexillum goubini plurinotata (R.P.J. Hervier, 1897) is a synonym of Vexillum plurinotatum (R.P.J. Hervier, 1897)

Distribution
Its type locality is Lifou, New Caledonia, and it is named in honor of its collector, Benjamin Goubin.

References

External links

 

goubini
Gastropods described in 1897
Fauna of New Caledonia